David Lowe may refer to:

Academics
Dave Lowe (atmospheric scientist) (born 1946), New Zealand atmospheric scientist
David Fowler Lowe (1843–1924), headmaster of George Heriot's School
David G. Lowe, Canadian professor of computer science
David Lowe (historian) (born 1964), Australian historian and biographer
Sir David Lowe (horticulturalist) (1899–1980), Scottish horticulturalist and businessman

Arts
David Lowe (actor) (born 1955), English film director, actor, composer and scientist
David Lowe (producer) (1913–1965), American television producer
David Lowe (television and radio composer) (born 1959), English composer focusing primarily on music for television
David Lowe (video game composer), English composer known for his work on 8-bit and 16-bit computer games

Sports
David Lowe (cricketer) (born 1979), former English cricketer
David Lowe (footballer) (born 1965), English professional football player
David Lowe (footballer, born 1963), Australian footballer for clubs such as Newcastle KB
David Lowe (sport shooter), British sports shooter
David Lowe (swimmer) (born 1960), English butterfly and freestyle swimmer

Others
David Nicoll Lowe (1909–1999), secretary of the Carnegie Trust, 1954–1970
David Perley Lowe (1823–1882), U.S. Representative from Kansas
David Lowe (socialist) (1867–1947), Scottish socialist activist
David Lowe (winemaker) (born 1958), Australian winemaker

See also
David Low (disambiguation)